Mèze is a commune in the Hérault department in southern France.

Its inhabitants are called Mézois.

Geography

Situated on the étang de Thau, Mèze shares with Bouzigues its historic role as the oyster capital of the area.  Almost a third of its inhabitants depend on the fishing industry for their livelihood. In recent years, tourism and transport have become increasingly central to the local economy.

History
An important port since Phoenician times, Mèze has always primarily been a fishing town. During the Roman Empire, the town lay on the main Southern route from Italy to Spain - the 'Via Domitia'. The Romans brought wine to the area and left a legacy of architecture including two of the town's churches. The production of shellfish, especially oysters, has been the mainstay of the Mèze economy for almost a century and the whole Bassin de Thau area has built an international reputation for the quality of its seafood.

Administration

Population

Sights

 Old village center
 Port Mèze: both a working fishing harbor and a port for recreational boating.
 Lagunage ecological site
 Dinosaur Plain''' palenthology museum.
 Eglise Saint Hilaire
 La Chapelle des Pénitents (12th century)
 Le château de Girard (end of 17th century)
 Remains of city walls
 St-Jean-de-la-Garrigue, former parish church, built in romanesque style.

 Personalities 
 The French Arabist and historian André Miquel was born in Mèze.
 Singer Pierre Vassiliu lived for many years in Mèze.
 Singer Christian Delagrange lives in Mèze.

Festivals
 Music Festival de Thau (annual),
 A festival of traditional Boat Jousting is held each summer.

Traditions
The legendary bœuf de Mèze has become the animal symbol of the town.
The Balle au tambourin'' ball game.

See also
Communes of the Hérault department

References

External links

  Website of panoramic photos of Mèze and its region
 Official site
 Festival of Thau

Communes of Hérault